The United States Postal Service uses the words "flats" and "nonletters" interchangeably to refer to large envelopes, newsletters, and magazines.

Size restrictions
To fit the definition a flat must:

Have one dimension that is greater than 6-1/8 inches high OR 11-½ inches long (the side parallel to the address as read) OR ¼ inch thick.
Be no more than 12 inches high x 15 inches long x ¾ inch thick.
Weigh no more than 13 ounces.

Furthermore, the item must be somewhat bendable: see the USPS Domestic Mail Manual for exact details.
This general rule does not apply to: Automation rate flats and Standard Mail Enhanced Carrier Route flats.

Postage
The maximum size for a flat provides enough room to enclose much material. An issue, however, is that the higher the weight the higher the postage, especially for First-Class Mail.

External links and references 
Domestic Mail Manual 101.2 Flats Physical Standards

United States Postal Service